Chris Pickett (born 15 September 1955) is a New Zealand cricketer. He played in one first-class and one List A match for Wellington in 1983/84.

See also
 List of Wellington representative cricketers

References

External links
 

1955 births
Living people
New Zealand cricketers
Wellington cricketers
Cricketers from Christchurch